The St. Thomas Bobcats are the athletic teams that represent St. Thomas University, located in Miami Gardens, Florida, in intercollegiate sports as a member of the National Association of Intercollegiate Athletics (NAIA), primarily competing in the Sun Conference (formerly known as the Florida Sun Conference (FSC) until after the 2007–08 school year) since the 1990–91 academic year. The Bobcats previously competed in the Sunshine State Conference (SSC) of the NCAA Division II ranks from 1975–76 to 1986–87.

Varsity teams
St. Thomas competes in 28 intercollegiate varsity sports: Men's sports include baseball, basketball, cross country, football, golf, rugby, soccer, swimming & diving (2020), tennis, track & field and wrestling (2020); while women's sports include basketball, beach volleyball, bowling, cross country, flag football (2020), golf, lacrosse, rugby, soccer, softball, swimming & diving (2020), tennis, track & field and volleyball; and co-ed sports include cheerleading, competitive dance and eSports.

History
St. Thomas has won the NAIA men's basketball championship three times: in 1994, 1997, and 2009.

St. Thomas University added men's and women's track & field as a varsity sport in 2018 as well as a football team and marching band in 2019. The Bobcats football team competes in the Sun Division of the Mid-South Conference, and  play their home games at Monsignor Pace High School.

References

External links